Ternevig is a neighbourhood in the city of Kristiansand in Agder county, Norway. The neighborhood is located in the borough of Vågsbygd and in the district of Voiebyen. Ternevig is northeast of Møvik, southeast of Voie, east of Møviklia, and west of the ocean and the island of Andøya.   There is a small hospital located in Ternevig serving the borough of Vågsbygd. There is also a marina located in this neighborhood.

Transport

References

Geography of Kristiansand
Neighbourhoods of Kristiansand